Sodium trichloroacetate is a chemical compound with a formula of CCl3CO2Na. It is used to increase sensitivity and precision during transcript mapping. It was previously used as an herbicide starting in the 1950s but regulators removed it from the market in the late 1980s and early 1990s.

Preparation 
Sodium trichloroacetate is made by reaction trichloroacetic acid with sodium hydroxide:

CCl3CO2H + NaOH -> CCl3CO2Na + H2O

Reactions

Basicity 
Sodium trichloroacetate is a weaker base than sodium acetate because of the electron-withdrawing nature of the trichloromethyl group. Sodium trifluoroacetate is likewise a weaker base. However, it can easily be protonated in the presence of suitably strong acids:

CCl3CO2- + H2SO4 -> CCl3CO2H + HSO4-

Trichloromethyl-anion precursor 
This reagent is useful for introducing the trichloromethyl group into other molecules. Decarboxylation produces the trichloromethyl anion, which is a sufficiently strong nucleophile to attack various carbonyl functional groups, such as aldehydes, carboxylic acid anhydrides, ketones (making a precursor for the Jocic–Reeve reaction), and acyl halides.

See also 

 Trichloroacetic acid
 Sodium trifluoroacetate
 Sodium chloroacetate

References 

Organic sodium salts
Trichloromethyl compounds